Latife Bekir (1901-1952) was a Turkish politician, suffragist and women's rights activist. 

She was educated in France, and worked as a French language teacher at a girls' school in Istanbul. 

She was an important figure in Turkish feminism. In 1917, she became engaged in the Osmanlı Műdafaa-ı Hukûk-ı Nisvan Cemiyeti.

In 1924, she and Nezihe Muhiddin was the co-founders of the women's suffrage organization Türk Kadinlar Birligi. She succeeded Nezihe Muhiddin as the President of the Türk Kadinlar Birligi and held the office in 1927-1935. She was a supporter of the governments non-compulsory policy against veiling. 

She was the first women to be elected to a city council in Turkey. She was also an MP for İzmir in 1946-1950.

References

Gizem Gümüş - Türk Kadın Hareketinde Latife Bekir Çeyrekbaşı (Işıkdoğdu)

1901 births
1952 deaths
Turkish women activists
Turkish feminists
20th-century Turkish women politicians
Expatriates from the Ottoman Empire in France